Galvez, Gálvez or de Gálvez may refer to:

People with the surname

Gálvez or Galvez 
Axel Jason M.Gálvez (born 1980),UBCP ACTRA Performer Easter Sunday comedy Jokoy / WE CARE FOR HUMANITY Publicity Ambassador Vancouver BC Canada. 
Armando Gálvez, Guatemalan professor
Balvino Gálvez (born 1964), former Major League Baseball pitcher
Byron Galvez (1941 – 2009), Mexican artist
Carlito Galvez Jr. (born 1962), Filipino retired army general
Christian Gálvez, Chilean football defender
Christian Gálvez, Spanish TV presenter and writer
Ciro Gálvez, Peruvian lawyer and politician
Eric Gálvez, professional squash player
Felicity Galvez, Australian swimmer and Olympic gold medalist
Gaspar Gálvez Burgos, Spanish professional footballer
Isaac Gálvez, Spanish track and road racing cyclist
José Gálvez Estévez, Spanish footballer
Juan Gálvez (racing driver), Argentine racing driver
Juan Manuel Gálvez (1889-1972), President of Honduras 1949-1952
Karina Galvez, Ecuadorian poet
Manuel Gálvez, Argentine novelist
Mariano Gálvez (c.1794 – 1862), jurist and Liberal politician in Guatemala
Maria Rosa Galvez (1768–1806), Spanish poet and dramatist
Oscar Alfredo Gálvez (1913 – 1989), racing driver from Argentina
Rosario Gálvez (1926 – 2015), Mexican actress

de Gálvez 

 Luis Estévez de Gálvez (1930–2014), Cuban-born American fashion designer, distant relative of Bernardo de Gálvez
 Bernardo de Gálvez (1746-1786), Count of Gálvez, (of Galvez, Toledo in the Kingdom of Spain), a Spanish colonial military leader in Spanish Louisiana, West Florida, Texas and Mexico (New Spain)
 José de Gálvez y Gallardo, (1720–1787) Spanish lawyer and colonial official, brother to Matías de Gálvez 
 Matías de Gálvez y Gallardo, (1717–1784) Spanish general, father of Bernardo de Gálvez

Places
 United States
Galvez, Louisiana
Galveston, Texas
 Argentina
 Villa Gobernador Gálvez
 Gálvez, Santa Fe
 Spain
 Gálvez, Toledo

Misc
 Gálvez (Vino de la Tierra), a Spanish wine region near Galvez, in the province of  Toledo in Spain
 Autódromo Juan y Oscar Gálvez, motor racing circuit in Buenos Aires, Argentina
 José Gálvez FBC, Peruvian football club
 Galvez Hotel, historic hotel located in Galveston, Texas
 Juan Manuel Gálvez International Airport on Roatan Island off the northern coast of Honduras in Central America. Named for a former President of Honduras

Spanish-language surnames